Wenn alles richtig ist, dann stimmt was nich ("When Everything's Right, Something's Wrong") is a studio album by German pop singer Nena, released on 6 July 1998. It marks a return to a more rock-oriented sound.

The only official single from this album is "Was hast du in meinem Traum gemacht". Another two tracks "Das ist normal" and "Dann fiel mir auf" were released as promotional singles, and Nena performed still another track ("Wenn wenigstens Sommer wär") in the German TV drama series Die Affäre Semmeling.

Track listing

Charts

References

External links
 

1998 albums
Nena albums
German-language albums
Polydor Records albums